The European AIDS Clinical Society (EACS) is a not-for-profit organisation. Founded in 1991, the EACS has the stated mission to promote quality care, research and education of HIV and related infections with a view to reducing its burden on Europe.

The current President of the EACS is Sanjay Bhagani, elected in 2020.

European AIDS Conference 
The EACS organises the European AIDS Conference which is held every two years and brings together scientists from across Europe to exchange the latest information regarding HIV/AIDS.

References 

1991 establishments in Belgium
HIV/AIDS research organisations
Organisations based in Belgium